The Jefferson Franklin Jackson House, commonly known as the Jackson-Community House, is a historic Italianate-style house in  Montgomery, Alabama. It was added to the Alabama Register of Landmarks and Heritage on July 21, 1978, and to the National Register of Historic Places on May 17, 1984.

History
The two-story frame house was built by Jefferson Franklin Jackson in 1853.  Jackson served as a United States Attorney for northern and central Alabama.  He died during the Civil War years.  His wife subsequently remarried to Thomas H. Watts, Governor of Alabama from 1863 to 1865. Descendants of the family owned the house into the 20th century and it remained a residence until 1943.

The house was purchased in 1943 by the Montgomery City Federation of Colored Women's Clubs, an African American organization comprising twenty-five adult clubs and fifteen youth clubs, for use as a meeting place.  The Montgomery City Federation had been formed in 1939 with a goal of promoting positive citizenship.  The house became known as the Community House and was used as a Girl Scouts headquarters, a social and civic center, and, in December 1948, the first Montgomery library open to African Americans.  Significantly, the house was used to host meetings of the Women's Political Council. They were the first group to officially call for a boycott of the racially segregated Montgomery bus system, leading to the Montgomery bus boycott.

See also
National Register of Historic Places listings in Montgomery County, Alabama
Properties on the Alabama Register of Landmarks and Heritage in Montgomery County, Alabama

References

Houses on the National Register of Historic Places in Alabama
Houses completed in 1853
Italianate architecture in Alabama
National Register of Historic Places in Montgomery, Alabama
Properties on the Alabama Register of Landmarks and Heritage
African-American history in Montgomery, Alabama
Houses in Montgomery, Alabama